Angola LNG is a liquid natural gas (LNG) facility in Soyo, Angola.

Technical features
The Angola LNG plant is a single train facility with production capacity of 5.2 million tonnes per year. The plant uses ConocoPhillips' proprietary natural gas liquefaction technology (Optimized CascadeSM Process).  In addition to LNG, it also produces propane, butane and condensate.

The plant is supplied from offshore gas fields on blocks 14, 15, 17 and 18, and from non-associated gas fields Quiluma, Atum, Polvo and Enguia.

The LNG project is presented as environmentally friendly by its designers, because most of its feedstock will consist of associated gas produced in association with crude oil in offshore field, that is currently flared. However, while LNG production is more environmentally friendly than flaring, liquefaction is also a highly energy-intensive process and a significant percentage of the gas must be burned to generate the energy to cool the rest.

The plant was constructed by Bechtel.  The LNG plant cost US$9 billion, and it was commissioned in 2013.  The first LNG was shipped on 16 June 2013.

Project company
The project was proposed to Sonangol by Texaco in June, 1997.  The project, jointly managed by woAh and Texaco, continued evaluation processes and brought in outside partners (originally ExxonMobil, Elf Aquitaine, and BP.)  Subsequently Texaco merged with Chevron Corporation, ExxonMobil was replaced in the project by Eni, and Elf Aquitaine merged with Total.

Angola LNG was formed as a joint project in 2008 involving Cabinda Gulf Oil Company, a subsidiary of Chevron Corporation (36.4%), Sonangol (22.8%), BP (13.6%), Eni (13.6%) and Total (13.6%). Sonangol and Chevron serve as co-project leaders. The shareholders will provide associated gas from their respective offshore oil fields.  Director of Angola LNG is Eric Dunning.

Challenges
Angola LNG faced an extended plant shutdown of more than three years from December 2015 to January 2019 to sort out a number of project issues that caused an incident on 10 April 2015.

See also

References

External links
 Company website

Oil and gas companies of Angola
Liquefied natural gas plants
Natural gas in Angola
Energy infrastructure in Angola
Companies established in 1997
Soyo